Andrzej Mieczysław Juskowiak (born 3 November 1970) is a former Polish football striker who played for the Poland national team.

International career
Nicknamed "Jusko", he was at the 1992 Summer Olympics tournament the top goal scorer, when Poland won the silver medal.

He played for the Poland national team, appearing in 39 matches and scoring 13 goals.

International goals
Scores and results table. Poland's goal tally first:

Honours

Club
Lech Poznań
Ekstraklasa : 1990, 1992

Sporting CP
Cup of Portugal: 1994–95

International
Poland u23
Summer Olympic Games: Runner-up 1992

Individual
Summer Olympic Games: Top goalscorer 1992

References

1970 births
Living people
People from Gostyń
Polish footballers
Poland international footballers
Polish expatriate footballers
Footballers at the 1992 Summer Olympics
Olympic footballers of Poland
Olympic silver medalists for Poland
Kania Gostyń players
Lech Poznań players
Olympiacos F.C. players
Borussia Mönchengladbach players
FC Energie Cottbus players
Sporting CP footballers
VfL Wolfsburg players
New York Red Bulls players
FC Erzgebirge Aue players
Ekstraklasa players
Primeira Liga players
Bundesliga players
2. Bundesliga players
Super League Greece players
Major League Soccer players
Expatriate footballers in Germany
Expatriate footballers in Greece
Expatriate footballers in Portugal
Polish expatriate sportspeople in Portugal
Expatriate soccer players in the United States
Olympic medalists in football
Sportspeople from Greater Poland Voivodeship
Medalists at the 1992 Summer Olympics
Association football forwards